Lewis Creek is an unincorporated community in Washington Township, Shelby County, in the U.S. state of Indiana.

History
Lewis Creek was founded in 1856. The community was a station and shipping point on the railroad.

A post office was established at Lewis Creek in 1861, and remained in operation until it was discontinued in 1931.

Geography

References

Unincorporated communities in Shelby County, Indiana
Unincorporated communities in Indiana